|}

This is a list of electoral district results for the Victorian 1929 election.

Results by electoral district

Albert Park

Allandale

Ballarat

Barwon

Benalla

Benambra

Bendigo

Boroondara

Brighton 

|- style="background-color:#E9E9E9"
! colspan="6" style="text-align:left;" |After distribution of preferences

 Preferences were not distributed to completion.

Brunswick

Bulla and Dalhousie 

 Two party preferred vote was estimated.

Carlton

Castlemaine and Kyneton

Caulfield

Clifton Hill

Coburg

Collingwood

Dandenong

Dundas

Essendon 

 Two party preferred vote was estimated.

Evelyn

Flemington

Footscray

Geelong

Gippsland East

Gippsland North

Gippsland South

Gippsland West

Goulburn Valley

Grant 

 Two party preferred vote was estimated.

Gunbower

Hampden

Hawthorn

Heidelberg

Kara Kara and Borung

Kew 

 Two party preferred vote was estimated.

Korong and Eaglehawk

Lowan

Maryborough and Daylesford

Melbourne

Mildura

Mornington

Northcote

Nunawading

Oakleigh

Ouyen

Polwarth

Port Fairy and Glenelg 

 Preferences were not distributed.

Port Melbourne

Prahran

Richmond

Rodney

St Kilda

Stawell and Ararat

Swan Hill

Toorak

Upper Goulburn

Upper Yarra

Walhalla

Wangaratta and Ovens

Waranga 

 Preferences were not distributed.

Warrenheip and Grenville

Warrnambool

Williamstown

Wonthaggi

See also 

 1929 Victorian state election
 Candidates of the 1929 Victorian state election
 Members of the Victorian Legislative Assembly, 1929–1932

References 

Results of Victorian state elections
1920s in Victoria (Australia)